Kota Raja was a state constituency in Selangor, Malaysia, that was represented in the Selangor State Legislative Assembly from 1995 to 2004.

The state constituency was created in the 1994 redistribution and was mandated to return a single member to the Selangor State Legislative Assembly under the first past the post voting system.

History
It was abolished in 2004 when it was redistributed.

Representation history

Election results

References

Defunct Selangor state constituencies